Clem may refer to:

Places
Clem, Oregon, United States, an unincorporated community
Clem, West Virginia, United States, an unincorporated community
Clem Nunatak, a nunatak in the Ross Dependency, Antarctica

Other uses
Clem (hill), a categorisation of British hills
Clem (horse), an American Thoroughbred racehorse active in the 1950s
Clem (name), a list of people with the given name, nickname or surname
Clem (TV series), a French TV series
Clem., author abbreviation for the plant ecologist Frederic Clements
Correlative Light-Electron Microscopy (CLEM)
Clem, another name for the character in Kilroy was here graffiti

See also
Clems, California, a ghost town
Klem, a surname (includes a list of people with the name)